WMTB-FM (89.9 FM) is the student radio station of Mount Saint Mary's. Licensed to Emmitsburg, Maryland, United States, the station offers mainly student-and-faculty produced programming. The station also offers a Classic Rock automation format when programming is not live.

External links

MTB-FM
MTB-FM
Catholic radio stations
Emmitsburg, Maryland
Radio stations established in 1969
1969 establishments in Maryland
Catholic Church in Maryland